Saurida umeyoshii is a species of lizardfish that lives in the Pacific Ocean.

Information
S. umeyoshii can be found in a marine environment within a pelagic-neritic range. The depth range of this species ranges to about 100 meters. S.  umeyoshii is native to a temperate climate. The maximum recorded length of this species as an unsexed male is about 33.7 centimeters or about 13.26 inches.  S. umeyoshii is distributed off the Pacific coast of Asia, off Owase, off Kochi, western Sea of Japan, eastern coast of Kyushu, East China Sea, and Taiwan.  It is common to find this species occupying the area of continental shelves deeper than 100 meters.

Common names
The common names of S. umeyoshii in different languages include the following:
Al-alibot : Ilokano 
Balanghuten : Tagalog
Balanghuten : Visayan
Basasong : Pangasinan
Bekut laut : Malay 
Bubule : Tagalog
Butong-panday : Bikol
Cá Mối thường : Vietnamese 
Chonor : Malay 
Daldalag : Ilokano
Hai la : Malay 
Kalaso : Tagalog
Karaho : Cebuano
Karaho : Hiligaynon
Kortfinnet øglefisk : Danish (dansk)
Kuti-kuti : Agutaynen
Mengkarong : Malay (bahasa Melayu)
Mengkerong : Malay (bahasa Melayu)
Short-finned lizardfish : English
Short-finned saury : English
Shortfin saury : English
Talad : Waray-waray
Talho : Waray-waray
Tamangkah : Chavacano
Tigbasbay : Maranao/Samal/Tao Sug
Tigbasbay : Tagalog
Tiki : Bikol
Tiki : Davawenyo
Tiki : Wolof (Wollof)
Tiki-tiki : Cebuano
Tiki-tiki : Kuyunon
Tiki-tiki : Tagalog
Tiki-tiki : Visayan
Tuko : Tagalog
Ubi : Malay (bahasa Melayu)
短臂蛇鲻 : Mandarin Chinese

References

Notes
 

Synodontidae
Taxa named by Tetsuji Nakabo
Fish described in 2006